Josh Fadem (born July 19, 1980) is an American actor, writer, and comedian.

Early life
Fadem was born and raised in Tulsa, Oklahoma, where he attended Booker T. Washington High School. He has lived and worked in Los Angeles since 2000.

Career
He is known for playing film student Joey Dixon on the AMC series Better Call Saul and Liz Lemon's agent Simon Barrons on the NBC series 30 Rock. He has also appeared on the third season of Twin Peaks as Phil Bisby, Key & Peele, It's Always Sunny in Philadelphia, The Whitest Kids U' Know, and Comedy Bang! Bang!. He starred in the Misfits & Monsters episode "Patsy".

Filmography

Film

Television

References

External links

1980 births
Living people
American male film actors
American male comedians
21st-century American comedians
American male television actors
Male actors from Tulsa, Oklahoma
Writers from Tulsa, Oklahoma
Upright Citizens Brigade Theater performers